Nelson Williams (April 2, 1825December 30, 1899) was a Canadian American immigrant and Republican politician.  He served two years in the Wisconsin State Senate and one year in the State Assembly, representing Dane County.

Biography
Williams was born in Clarenceville, Lower Canada, in what is now southern Quebec.  He was raised and educated there, emigrating to the United States in 1855, and settling at Stoughton, Wisconsin, where he worked in grain trade.  He became active in the new Republican Party and, in 1864, he was employed as sergeant-at-arms of the Wisconsin Senate, chosen by the members.  He was then retained for the 1865 and 1866 sessions.  In 1867, he was appointed to the University of Wisconsin Board of Regents.

Later that year, he was elected to the Wisconsin State Assembly on the Republican ticket, representing southeast Dane County.  After his one-year term in the Assembly, he was elected to the Wisconsin State Senate for the 1869 and 1870 sessions.

After the close of the 1870 session, Williams relocated to Minneapolis, Minnesota, where he remained for the rest of his life.  In Minneapolis, he co-owned a pharmacy and later became involved in the real estate business.  He invested heavily in land around Lake Minnetonka, where he primarily resided, and served a term as Superintendent of the Poor in Minneapolis.

Williams suffered from stomach cancer and died at his home, 912 2nd Avenue, South, in Minneapolis on the morning of December 30, 1899.

Personal life and family
Williams married his first wife, Emily, while living in Canada, but she died at Stoughton in 1857, at age 25.  He then married Delette Huldah Stoughton, the daughter of Luke Stoughton, the founder and namesake of Stoughton.  With his second wife, Williams had four children.

Two of Williams' grandchildren, Willis and Ethel Peck, died in the Iroquois Theatre fire in Chicago.

References

External links
 

Republican Party Wisconsin state senators
Republican Party members of the Wisconsin State Assembly
1825 births
1899 deaths